Amar Pritpal bin Abdullah is a Malaysian politician and currently serves as Deputy Speaker of the Penang State Legislative Assembly.

Election results

Honours 
  :
  Officer of the Order of the Defender of State (DSPN) – Dato' (2020)

References 

Living people
People from Penang
Malaysian people of Indian descent
Converts to Islam from Sikhism
Malaysian people of Punjabi descent
People's Justice Party (Malaysia) politicians
21st-century Malaysian politicians
Year of birth missing (living people)
Members of the Penang State Legislative Assembly